The Awaj ( Nahr al-A‘waj, literally 'crooked') is a river in Syria.

The river is usually identified as the Biblical Pharpar, mentioned in the Book of Kings.

References

See also
Water resources management in Greater Damascus

Rivers of Syria